The 2014 Women's Softball World Championship was an international softball competition that was held in Haarlem, Netherlands from August 15 to August 24, 2014. It was the 14th edition of the tournament, the first edition ever held in Europe, and also the first edition to be sanctioned by the World Baseball Softball Confederation (WBSC). Previous editions were sanctioned by the International Softball Federation, which governed the sport until its 2013 merger with the International Baseball Federation to create the WBSC.

Qualification

Group stage

Section A

Section B

Playoffs

Day 1

Day 2

Medal Round

Final standings

References

External links
Official Website

Womens Softball World Championship
Women's Softball World Championship
Womens Softball World Championship
International sports competitions hosted by the Netherlands
Softball competitions in the Netherlands
Softball World Championship
Sports competitions in Haarlem